William Sælid Sell (born 20 December 1998) is a Norwegian footballer who plays as a defender for Lyn.

Career
Hailing from Hvittingfoss, Sell joined Mjøndalen in 2014. He made his senior debut at age 17 in April 2016. On 31 August 2021, he transferred to Norwegian Third Division club Lyn on a contract until the end of the 2023 season.

Career statistics

Notes

References

1998 births
Living people
People from Kongsberg
Norwegian footballers
Norway youth international footballers
Norway under-21 international footballers
Association football defenders
Eliteserien players
Norwegian First Division players
Norwegian Third Division players
Mjøndalen IF players
Lyn Fotball players
Sportspeople from Viken (county)